The Silliman University College of Arts and Sciences is one of the constituent colleges of Silliman University, a private research university found in Dumaguete, Philippines. Granted Level III accreditation status by recognized accrediting agencies in the Philippine educational system, the College provides undergraduate and graduate instruction in various areas of learning such as in the fields of Anthropology, Creative Writing, English Language, Filipino, History, Literature, Philosophy, Political Science, Sociology, Physics, Chemistry, Biology, Mathematics among others.

The College traces its origins to the year 1909 when the then Silliman Institute offered its first classical two-year A.B. course. In 1921, the College obtained recognition for its offering of a four-year A.B. degree.  At about the same time, a science course was also offered, a B.S. degree major in Chemistry.

During its early years of existence and up to the Second World War, the College operated under two independent colleges: the College of Liberal Arts and the College of Sciences, then administered by Silliman's Department of Instruction. Over the years, these two colleges operated independently of each other. The departments that existed under the set-up were: Bible (1902); Biology (1909); Chemistry (1909); Mathematics (1920); English (1923); and Spanish (1936). In 1947, the College of Liberal Arts and the College of Sciences merged to become the present-day College of Arts and Sciences.

Academics

Departments
At present, the College is composed of the following departments:
Anthropology and Sociology
Biology
Chemistry
English and Literature
History and Political Science
Filipino and Foreign Languages
Mathematics
Philosophy and Religion
Physics
Psychology
Social Work

Alumni
 Carlos P. Garcia, 8th President of the Philippines
 Antonio Villamor, Ambassador to the Kingdom of Saudi Arabia.
 Lorenzo Teves, Senator of the Philippines
 Roseller Lim, Senator of the Philippines
 Robert Barbers, Senator of the Philippines
 Jesus Elbinias, Presiding Justice of the Philippine Court of Appeals.
 Vicente Sinco, 8th President of the University of the Philippines and founder of Foundation University
 Emilio Macias, Governor of Negros Oriental
 Leopoldo Ruiz, Philippine Consul-General at Chicago, U.S.
 Julian Teves, Governor of Negros Oriental
 George Arnaiz, Congressman, Negros Oriental
 Simeon Toribio, Filipino Olympian and Congressman
 Cornelio Villareal, Speaker of the House, Congress of the Philippines
 Guillermo Villanueva, Governor of Negros Oriental
 Felipe Antonio B. Remollo -Mayor of Dumaguete

References

External links
College of Arts and Sciences. official website

Arts and Sciences
Liberal arts colleges in the Philippines